The Collin County Outer Loop is a planned loop that will serve growing areas of Collin County, Texas in North Texas. It is a section of the planned Texas State Highway Loop 9 around the North Texas area. Upon completion, the Outer Loop will be the third limited-access belt road for Dallas, following Interstate 635 (L.B.J. Freeway) and the President George Bush Turnpike.

Current status
In its current state the Outer Loop runs 4.6 miles from US 75 in Anna to SH 121 just northeast of Melissa. This section was built at a cost of $21 million. This section of road runs as a bi-directional two lane road, which will eventually be the north frontage road. The Collin County Commissioners Court approved a staff proposal during an 18 March 2019 meeting to build the Outer Loop as a freeway instead of as a tollway as originally planned.

A 1.8 mile section of the loop, running between Dallas Parkway (future Dallas North Tollway) and SH 289 (Preston Road), opened to traffic in summer 2021.

Future
The Outer Loop is planned to run for approximately 50 miles from the future northern extension of the Dallas North Tollway in Celina to Interstate 30 near Royse City. The loop will be built in five different segments (including the section of road already open).

Segment 1
Segment 1 is the first section of road opened, running from US 75 to SH 121. This section will eventually become the north frontage road as main freeway lanes are added.

Segment 2
Segment 2 will run from FM 6 between Nevada and Josephine to the Rockwall County line near Royse City. This segment could possibly be extended further south past Interstate 30 through Rockwall, Kaufman and Dallas counties as part of a much larger outer loop.

Segment 3
Segment 3 will run past US 75 to the future north extension of the Dallas North Tollway in Celina. This section will run through extreme north McKinney, close to Weston and cross SH 289 (Preston Road) before ending at the Dallas North Tollway. This section could possibly be extended further west through Denton County as part of a larger outer loop.

As of July 2017, Collin County is in the process of acquiring the land required to extend the current section opened to traffic. Construction is expected to begin in 2019. A two lane road between Dallas Parkway (future Dallas North Tollway) and SH 289 (Preston Road) opened in the summer of 2021. This section of road is currently being extended to FM 2478 (Custer Road), with an anticipated completion date of fall 2022.

Segment 4
Segment 4 will run from US 380 near Farmersville to FM 6 between Nevada and Josephine.

Segment 5
Segment 5 will connect segments 1 and 4, running through sparsely populated areas of the county.

Junction list

External links
 Overview map for the planned Outer Loop

References

Transportation in Collin County, Texas
Freeways in Texas
Beltways in the United States